Thomas Fichtner (born 30 December 1966) is a German sport shooter who competed in the 2000 Summer Olympics.

References

1966 births
Living people
German male sport shooters
Trap and double trap shooters
Olympic shooters of Germany
Shooters at the 2000 Summer Olympics